("Scenes from Childhood"), Op. 15, by Robert Schumann, is a set of thirteen pieces of music for piano written in 1838.

History and description
Schumann wrote 30 movements for this work but chose 13 for the final version. The unused movements were later published in Bunte Blätter, Op. 99, and Albumblätter, Op. 124. Schumann initially intended to publish Kinderszenen together with Novelletten (Opus 21); the shared literary theme is suggested by the original title Kindergeschichten (Children's Tales). He told his wife Clara that the "thirty small, droll things", most of them less than a page in length, were inspired by her comment that he sometimes seemed "like a child". He described them in 1840 as "more cheerful, gentler, more melodic" than his earlier works.

In Russia, a hummed choral a cappella version became known as mourning music, being played annually during the Minute of Silence on Victory Day. In 2021, violinist Fenella Humphreys released an arrangement of Träumerei for violin.

Originally called Leichte Stücke ("Easy Pieces"), the section titles were only added after the completion of the composition, and Schumann described them as "nothing more than delicate hints for execution and interpretation". Timothy D. Taylor, however, has discussed the choice of titles for this work in the context of the changing situation of music culturally and economically, stating that the final movement, entitled Der Dichter spricht (The Poet Speaks), marked a realisation among composers that, due to the decline of patronage structures in the 19th century, their musical works must take on new meanings.

There is no known complete manuscript of Kinderszenen.

Pieces

Notes

References

External links

, Cyprien Katsaris
 , Clifford Curzon

Piano music by Robert Schumann
Compositions for solo piano
1838 compositions